The Zarai Taraqiati Bank Limited women's cricket team is a Pakistani women's cricket team, sponsored by Zarai Taraqiati Bank Limited. They competed in the National Women's Cricket Championship, the Women's Cricket Challenge Trophy and the Departmental T20 Women's Championship between 2009–10 and 2018–19. They were the most successful side in all three competitions, winning every tournament they competed in, with 14 titles overall.

History
Zarai Taraqiati Bank Limited first competed in the National Women's Cricket Championship in 2009–10, winning every match in the group stages before beating Karachi in the final to claim their first title. Zarai Taraqiati Bank Limited went on to win every subsequent Championship that they competed in, in 2010–11, 2011–12, 2012–13, 2015, 2016 and 2017, without losing a match.

Zarai Taraqiati Bank Limited also competed in the Twenty20 Women's Cricket Challenge Trophy between 2011–12 and 2016–17. The side also won every tournament they competed in, again without losing a match. However, the title in 2014 was shared with Omar Associates after the final was curtailed due to rain.

The side also competed in the Departmental T20 Women's Championship in 2018 and 2018–19. They won both editions of the tournament, but did lose their only ever match during the 2018–19 season, losing to State Bank of Pakistan by 5 wickets.

Players

Notable players
Players who played for Zarai Taraqiati Bank Limited and played internationally are listed below, in order of first international appearance (given in brackets):

 Nazia Sadiq (1997)
 Sajjida Shah (2000)
 Batool Fatima (2001)
 Urooj Mumtaz (2004)
 Asmavia Iqbal (2005)
 Qanita Jalil (2005)
 Sana Mir (2005)
 Bismah Maroof (2006)
 Nain Abidi (2006)
 Sadia Yousuf (2008)
 Almas Akram (2008)
 Javeria Khan (2008)
 Nahida Khan (2009)
 Sania Khan (2009)
 Marina Iqbal (2009)
 Nida Dar (2010)
 Rabiya Shah (2010)
 Kanwal Naz (2010)
 Mariam Hasan (2010)
 Kainat Imtiaz (2010)
 Masooma Junaid (2011)
 Javeria Rauf (2012)
 Anam Amin (2014)
 Maham Tariq (2014)
 Sidra Nawaz (2014)
 Aliya Riaz (2014)
 Diana Baig (2015)
 Muneeba Ali (2016)
 Aiman Anwer (2016)
 Nashra Sandhu (2017)
 Omaima Sohail (2018)
 Fatima Sana (2019)

Seasons

National Women's Cricket Championship

Women's Cricket Challenge Trophy

Departmental T20 Women's Championship

Honours
 National Women's Cricket Championship:
 Winners (7): 2009–10, 2010–11, 2011–12, 2012–13, 2015, 2016 & 2017
 Women's Cricket Challenge Trophy
 Winners (5): 2011–12, 2012–13, 2014, 2015–16 & 2016–17
 Departmental T20 Women's Championship
 Winners (2): 2018 & 2018–19

See also
 Zarai Taraqiati Bank Limited cricket team

References

Women's cricket teams in Pakistan